Mark W. Smith (born September 4, 1968, in Cheverly, Maryland) is the New York Times bestselling author of several books, a former professor of law, and the founding partner of a Rockefeller Center-based law firm in New York City.  Smith is a regular political and legal commentator in the national media and is a former semi-professional baseball player.

Mark is a trial lawyer and conservative writer. He is the author of Official Handbook of the Vast Right-Wing Conspiracy (2004), and of Disrobed: The New Battle Plan to Break the Left's Stranglehold on the Courts (2007).

Graduating from New York University School of Law in 1995, Smith is currently a trial lawyer in private practice in New York City. He has previously served as a public interest lawyer representing a variety of clients (such as a case in 1997 about hair-braiding regulations in New York), many of whom alleged infringements upon their Constitutional rights. He has also been an adjunct professor of law at the University of Kansas Law School, where he taught a course on American laws with respect to firearms ownership, and clerked for a federal judge.

Upbringing and education
Born in Maryland and raised in Vermont, played semi-professional baseball in the Northern League for the Saxtons River Pirates as an infielder.  After spending three years at the University of Vermont, Smith went on to receive a bachelor's degree in Economics in 1992 from the University of South Carolina where he studied with Robert W. Clower, the former Managing Editor of the American Economics Review and Rhodes Scholar.  Smith graduated Phi Beta Kappa and was on the All-American Debate Team.

After graduating from the New York University School of Law (J.D.) in 1995, Mark clerked for the Honorable D. Brook Bartlett, Chief Judge, United States District Court for the Western District of Missouri.

Professional history
Smith is the founder of the Rockefeller Center-based law firm of Smith Valliere PLLC, which he founded in 2007.  The national media calls Smith "one of the fastest rising legal stars in the country."  Smith's courtroom and legal efforts have appeared on the covers of the New York Times, the Washington Times, Law.com, and the New York Law Journal as well as many other major media outlets.

Smith is also the New York Times bestselling author of several books, a former professor of law, and frequently appears as an expert legal commentator throughout the national media.

After graduating from the New York University School of Law, Smith clerked for a federal trial court judge in Kansas City.  Upon the completion of his clerkship, Smith joined Skadden, Arps, Slate, Meagher & Flom LLP in New York City.

Smith's legal practice covers a broad spectrum of areas including complex commercial disputes in the following areas: business, finance, employment, computer software, securities, civil rights, bankruptcy, constitutional, real estate, intellectual property, medical malpractice, class actions and antitrust matters.

Smith has tried jury and bench trials in state and federal court and represented clients in arbitrations, mediations, administrative law proceedings, and before governmental regulatory bodies.  In 2008, Smith served as lead trial counsel in a precedent-setting $23 million jury trial in New York City on behalf of large private MRI medical practice against over 50 insurance companies.  Many outlets covered the trial and its verdict and Smith appeared on the cover of New York Law Journal and Law.com. As co-counsel in a federal jury trial, Smith won for his clients a million-dollar judgment in a precedent-setting case that a cover story in the New York Times proclaimed to be the largest of its kind in New York history.  Smith represented a writer in a high-profile matter involving Tina Brown and the now-defunct Talk Miramax.  Smith has represented clients before the United States Supreme Court having represented Texas state legislators there in the Washington Legal Foundation v. Phillips matter in 1988.  The New York Times wrote a story about Smith's representation of two African-American women seeking to start a hair styling company in a highly publicized constitutional challenge to New York state economic regulations.

Smith has appeared in various gossip columns such as the New York Post'''s Page Six, the Huffington Post, Rush & Malloy, and Cindy Adams.  Smith has appeared in New York "society" publications such as Gotham, Hamptons, Avenue and New York Social Diary.

The press has discussed Smith and his representation of various writers.
 The New York Observer wrote a story about Smith's representation of a writer in a high-profile matter involving Tina Brown and Talk Miramax.

According to his firm's website, Smith has litigated matters involving major international companies such as Goldman Sachs, Bank of America, Charles Schwab, Deloitte & Touche, Wachovia, A.I.G., Adelphia Communications Corp, Talk Miramax, FoxMeyer Drug Company, Adelphia founder John Rigas, Continental Grain Company, Unilever, Salomon Smith Barney, and the U.S. Trust Company.  Smith advises businesses, companies and individuals in a wide variety of commercial transactions and business dealings including companies doing business in China, Hong Kong, and the European Union.  Smith has advised clients in connection with matters involving employment, severance, licensing, agency, assignment, intellectual property, film financing, publishing, settlement, and secured lending agreements and arrangements.

Professor of Law
As both a former adjunct professor of law at the University of Kansas School of Law, and former editor of the Harvard Journal of Law and Public Policy, Mark has been recognized as a legal expert in several publications of experts, including the Heritage Foundation's Policy Experts 2003: The Insider Guide to Public Policy Experts and Organizations, The Journalist's Guide to Legal Experts, and Policy Experts 2000: A Guide to Public Policy Experts.Lawyers.com 

Media coverage
Smith frequently appears as an expert legal analyst throughout the national media and appears regularly on CNN, the Fox News Channel, MSNBC and CNBC.  He has also been the subject of numerous articles in The New York Times, The Wall Street Journal, The New York Post, The Weekly Standard, The Washington Times, The New York Observer, The National Law Journal, Slate, The Hill, and ABC News' The Note, and has been written about in Page Six of The New York Post.Smith was profiled in Avenue magazine in 2009.

Smith's professional and personal accomplishments earned him an Alumnus of the Year honor from the University of South Carolina's Honors College and a Lifetime Achievement Award from the Bronx, New York Conservative Committee.

As co-counsel in a federal jury trial, he obtained a jury verdict for his client that The New York Times proclaimed as perhaps the largest in New York history of its kind.  Additionally he represented African-style hair braiders in a highly publicized, controversial constitutional challenge to New York state regulations and also served as counsel to Texas state legislators in a matter before the U.S. Supreme Court.

New York Times Bestselling Author
Mark is a New York Times bestselling author of The Official Handbook of the Vast Right-Wing Conspiracy: The Arguments You Need to Defeat the Looney Left and Disrobed: The New Battle Plan to Break the Left's Stranglehold on the Courts (Random House-Crown Forum 2006).
Amazon

Political and Legal Media Pundit
Mark is a frequent guest commentator regarding legal and political issues on national media shows such as 360 with Anderson Cooper, Glenn Beck, Paula Zahn Now, The O'Reilly Factor, Fox & Friends, C-SPAN's After Words, Hannity & Colmes, Dayside, The Dennis Miller Show, The Jackie Mason Show and Court TV's Catherine Crier Live!  Mark had appeared as a guest on the major television networks including on CNN, FOX NEWS CHANNEL, MSNBC, CNBC, BLOOMBERG, C-SPAN and COURT TV.

During the 2004 presidential election, Smith appeared as an analyst on Dan Rather's CBS Nightly News, CNN, the FOX NEWS CHANNEL and the Dennis Miller Show on CNBC, and also served as a special election night analyst for WPIX (Channel 11) in New York City.
Mark has appeared as a national radio personality in many major media markets having appeared in radio outlets such as Clear Channel Communications, XM Radio, Sirius Radio, WABC (New York), Fox News Radio, KRLA (Los Angeles), WRKO (Boston), America's Talk Satellite Network (Florida), WKAT (Miami), WIND (Chicago) KNTS (San Francisco), KSKY (Dallas), KLUP (San Antonio), KPIT (Pittsburgh), KNTP (Philadelphia), WITH (Baltimore) and Salem Communications.

Columbia UniversityThe Dennis Miller Show Top 100 Political Books on Amazon.com WTIC NewsTalk 1080 

Public speaking and academia
Smith is a regular at the Monday Meeting in New York City, which is a meeting of prominent conservative businessmen in New York founded by New York State Banking Commissioners Mallory Factor and James Higgins.
He has spoken at the National Press Club in Washington, D.C., Yale University, and the Cornell Club in New York City.  Smith has spoken at the Conservative Political Action Conference and FreedomFest in Las Vegas along with U.S. Vice President Dick Cheney, Whole Foods CEO John Mackey, former Speaker of the U.S. House of Representatives Newt Gingrich, former New York City mayor Rudy Giuliani, presidential candidate Mitt Romney, economist Art Laffer, authors Charles Murray, George Gilder, and Dinesh D'Souza, and Wall Street Journal editors Steven Moore, John Fund and James Taranto.

Smith has spoken at Al Sharpton's National Action Network Conference along with former U.S. Attorney Zach Carter, and at MoneyExpo 2009.

Charity
In March 2009, Smith hosted a charity event for the Humane Society of New York at the Hudson Terrace in New York City.  Stories about the event appeared on several websites dedicated to charity events and New York society.Fame Game

Socially Superlative 

Disrobed
According to the publisher, Disrobed argues that "who wins in the courts often depends more on politics and ideology than on the rule of law" and recommends that conservatives start using "liberal" tactics, identified by the author as judicial activism, rather than stay with the more typical conservative tactics such as judicial restraint, strict construction, or originalism.

References

BibliographyThe Official Handbook of the Vast Right-Wing Conspiracy. Washington, D.C.: Regnery, 2004. .Disrobed: The New Battle Plan to Break the Left's Stranglehold on the Courts.'' New York: Three Rivers Press. .

External links

1968 births
Living people
American writers
American lawyers
New York University School of Law alumni
People from Cheverly, Maryland
University of Kansas faculty
University of South Carolina alumni
Vermont Academy alumni